Spotted gum usually refers to the Australian tree species Corymbia maculata but may also refer to other closely related species within the genus Corymbia as follows:
Corymbia citriodora (usually referred to as the lemon-scented gum)
Corymbia henryi (large-leaved spotted gum)
Corymbia maculata (spotted gum)
Corymbia mannifera (mountain spotted gum or red spotted gum)